Hans Reiser (3 June 1919 – 10 June 1992) was a German film and television actor. He starred as Joseph Schmidt in the 1958 biopic A Song Goes Round the World, and The Great Escape (film) as Herr Kuhn. Reiser was born and died in Munich.

Filmography

References

Bibliography 
 Cowie, Peter. World Filmography 1968. Tantivy Press, 1968.

External links 
 
 

Male actors from Munich
1919 births
1992 deaths
German male film actors
German male television actors
20th-century German male actors